John Wade (born August 13, 1928) is an American rower. He and Ralph Stephan competed in the men's coxless pair event at the 1948 Summer Olympics.

References

External links
 

1928 births
Living people
American male rowers
Olympic rowers of the United States
Rowers at the 1948 Summer Olympics
Sportspeople from St. Louis